Effendi is a title of nobility.

Effendi or Efendi may also refer to:

People 
People with the surname or, especially in historical personalities, just an Ottoman title, include:

Effendi
 Abu Bakr Effendi (1814–1880), Ottoman qadi of Kurdish descent in the Cape of Good Hope (now South Africa) from 1862 to 1880
 Djohan Effendi (born 1939), Indonesian politician
 Latif Effendi, pseudonym of Andrea Debono (1821–1871), Maltese trader and explorer

Efendi
Historical
 Abbas Wasim Efendi (1689–1760), Ottoman astronomer 
 Abdülaziz Efendi (born 1735), Turkish physician
 Abdurrahman Bahir Efendi (Arabzade), Ottoman composer of vocal and instrumental Turkish classical music
 Agah Efendi (1832–1885), Ottoman civil servant, writer and newspaper editor
 Ahmed Resmî Efendi or Ahmed bin İbrahim Giridî, Ottoman Greek statesman, diplomat and author
 Ali Rıza Efendi (1839–1888), father of Mustafa Kemal Atatürk
 Çenebaz Osman Efendi, formally named as Yenişehirli Osman Efendi, Ottoman diplomat 
 Ebussuud Efendi (1490–1574), Hanafi Maturidi Ottoman jurist and Qur'an exegete
 Giritli Ali Aziz Efendi (1749–1798), Ottoman ambassador and author
 Halet Efendi (1761–1822), Ottoman diplomat and politician, ambassador
 Hammamizade İsmail Dede Efendi (1778–1846), Ottoman composer of Ottoman classical music
 Hattat Aziz Efendi (1871–1934), Ottoman calligrapher
 Hocazade Esad Efendi (1570–1625), Şeyhülislam (Minister of Islamic Issues) of the Ottoman Empire
 Ishak Efendi (c. 1774–1835), Ottoman mathematician and engineer
 İsmail Zühdi Efendi (????-1806), Ottoman calligrapher
 Kamal Kaya Efendi, Turkish military officer
 Kazasker Mustafa Izzet Efendi (1801–1876), Ottoman composer, neyzen, poet and statesman, calligrapher
 Mahmud Celaleddin Efendi (????-1829), Ottoman calligrapher
 Mehmed Shevki Efendi (1829–1887), Ottoman calligrapher
 Mehmet Cemaleddin Efendi (1848–1917), Ottoman senior judge
 Mehmet Esad Efendi (c. 1789–1848), Ottoman historian
 Merkez Efendi, popular nickname of Musa bin Muslihiddin bin Kılıç (1463–1552), Ottoman Islamic scholar and Sufi
 Muhib Efendi, Ottoman Empire ambassador to the court of Napoleon I in Paris in the early 19th century, between 1806 and 1811
 Mustafa Ruhi Efendi (1800-1893), a shaikh of the Naqshbandi tariqah and political leader in the Balkans
 Salih Efendi the Elder, prominent citizen of Shkodër in the 19th century
 Sami Efendi (1858-1912), Ottoman calligrapher
 Sayyid Ahmad Tawfiq Bay Sharif Efendi, Arab pan Islamist
 Sünbül Efendi (1452–1529), founder of the Sunbuliyye Sufi order
 Tamburi Ali Efendi (also spelled Tanburi or Tambouri), (1836–1902), Ottoman Turkish tambur virtuoso and composer
 Tatyos Efendi or Kemani Tatyos Ekserciyan (1858–1913), Ottoma-Armenian famous composer of classical Turkish music
 Yahya Efendi or Molla Shaykhzadeh (1494–1570), Ottoman Islamic scholar, Sufi, and poet
 Yedikuleli Seyyid 'Abdullah Efendi (1670-1731), Ottoman calligrapher
 Yesarizade Mustafa Izzet Efendi (????-1849), Ottoman calligrapher

Contemporary
 Efendi Abdul Malek (born 1978), Malaysian footballer
 Emin Efendi, Azerbaijani hip hop record producer and television presenter
 Gusripen Efendi (born 1986), Indonesian footballer
 Samira Efendi (born 1991), Azerbaijani singer, also known by the mononym Efendi
 Sugeng Efendi (born 1998), Indonesian footballer
 Sukasto Efendi (born 1981), Indonesian footballer

Places 
 Karadzor, formerly Efendi, a town in Armenia
 Norashen, Gegharkunik, formerly Efendi, a town in Armenia

Other uses 
 Effendi, a novel in the Arabesk trilogy, by Jon Courtenay Grimwood
 Effendi (horse), a racehorse
 Effendi, a ship named Lalla Rookh built in 1976, named Effendi for some years under the Norwegian flag
 "Oh Effendi", a 1974 song by 10cc on Sheet Music

Turkish-language surnames